Andrew Gordon Speedie Pask (28 June 1928 – 29 March 1996) was an English author, inventor, educational theorist, cybernetician and psychologist who made contributions to cybernetics, instructional psychology, experimental epistemology and educational technology. Pask first learned about cybernetics in the early 1950s when the originator of the subject, Norbert Wiener, spoke at Cambridge University, where Pask was an undergraduate student. Pask was asked to be of assistance during Wiener's talk.

Holding three doctorate degrees, Pask published more than 250 journal articles, books, patents and technical reports from funding from United States Armed Forces, the British Ministry of Defence, the British Home Office and the British Road Research Laboratory. He taught at the University of Illinois, Old Dominion University, Concordia University, Open University, University of New Mexico, Architectural Association School of Architecture and MIT.

Biography 
Pask was born in Derby, England, in 1928, and educated at Rydal Penrhos. Before qualifying precociously as a mining engineer at Liverpool Polytechnic, now Liverpool John Moores University, Pask studied geology at Bangor University. He obtained an MA in natural sciences from Cambridge in 1952 and a PhD in psychology from the University of London in 1964. Whilst visiting professor of educational technology, he obtained the first DSc from the Open University and an ScD from his college, Downing Cambridge in 1995. From the 1960s Pask directed commercial research at System Research Ltd in Richmond, Surrey and his partnership, Pask Associates.

Pask's primary contributions to cybernetics, educational psychology, learning theory and systems theory, as well as to numerous other fields, was his emphasis on the personal nature of reality, and on the process of learning as stemming from the consensual agreement of interacting actors in a given environment ("conversation").

His work was complex, extensive, and deeply thought out, at least until late in his life, when he benefited less often from critical feedback of research peers, reviewers of proposals and reports to government bodies in the US and UK, and, perhaps most especially, the tension between experimentation and theoretical stands. His publications, however, represent a storehouse of ideas that are not fully mined.

Pask held a teaching position at the Architectural Association in London, and many of Pask's PhD students were architects, including Ranulph Glanville.

Work

Musicolour 
Musicolour was an interactive light installation developed by Pask during the 1950s. It responded to musicians' variations and, if they did not vary their playing, it would become 'bored' and stop responding, prompting the musicians to respond.

Musicolour was influential on Cedric Price's Generator project, via the work of consultants Julia and John Frazer.

Fun Palace 
Pask collaborated with architect Cedric Price and theatre director Joan Littlewood on the radical Fun Palace project during the 1960s, setting up the project's 'Cybernetics Subcommittee'.

Colloquy of mobiles 
Pask participated in the seminal exhibition "Cybernetic Serendipity" (ICA London, 1968) with the interactive installation "Colloquy of Mobiles", continuing his ongoing dialogue with the visual and performing arts. (cf Rosen 2008, and Dreher's History of Computer Art)

Conversation theory 

Pask's most well known work was the development of Conversation theory. It came out of his work on instructional design and models of individual learning styles. In regard to learning styles, he identified conditions required for concept sharing and described the learning styles holist, serialist, and their optimal mixture versatile. He proposed a rigorous model of analogy relations.

Interactions of actors theory

Publications 
Pask wrote several books and more than two hundred journal articles.

Selected books
 1961, An Approach to Cybernetics. Hutchinson.
 1975, Conversation, cognition and learning. New York: Elsevier.
 1975, The Cybernetics of Human Learning and Performance. Hutchinson.
 1976, Conversation Theory, Applications in Education and Epistemology. Elsevier.
 1981,  Calculator Saturnalia, Or, Travels with a Calculator : A Compendium of Diversions & Improving Exercises for Ladies and Gentlemen with Ranulph Glanville and Mike Robinson. Wildwood.
 1982, Microman Living and growing with computers. with Susan Curran Macmillan.

Selected papers
 1993, Interactions of Actors, Theory and Some Applications, Download incomplete 90-page manuscript of 1993.
 1996, Heinz von Foerster's Self-Organisation, the Progenitor of Conversation and Interaction Theories, Systems Research (1996) 13, 3, pp. 349–362

Patent
 – Apparatus for assisting an operator in performing a skill (1961)

Exhibition
Cybernetic Serendipity, Institute of Contemporary Arts, London (1968)

Influence
Pask influenced Ted Nelson, who references Pask in Computer Lib/Dream Machines and whose interest in hypermedia is much like Pask's entailment meshes.

Pask influenced Nicholas Negroponte, whose earliest research efforts at the Architecture Machine Group on "idiosyncratic systems" and software-based partners for design have their roots in Pask's work as a consultant to Negroponte's efforts

See also 
 Eucrates

References

Further reading 
 Bird, J., and Di Paolo, E. A., (2008) Gordon Pask and his maverick machines. In P. Husbands, M. Wheeler, O. Holland (eds), The Mechanical Mind in History, Cambridge, MA: MIT Press, pp. 185 – 211. 
 Barnes, G. (1994) "Justice, Love and Wisdom" Medicinska Naklada, Zagreb .
 Glanville, R. and Scott, B. (2001). "About Gordon Pask", Special double issue of Kybernetes, Gordon Pask, Remembered and Celebrated, Part I, 30, 5/6, pp. 507–508.
 Green, N. (2004). "Axioms from Interactions of Actors Theory", Kybernetes, 33, 9/10, pp. 1433–1462. Download
 Glanville, R. (ed.) (1993). Gordon Pask—A Festschrift Systems Research, 10, 3.
 Pangaro, P. (1987). An Examination and Confirmation of a Macro Theory of Conversations through a Realization of the Protologic Lp by Microscopic Simulation  PhD Thesis Links
 Margit Rosen: "The control of control" – Gordon Pasks kybernetische Ästhetik. In: Ranulph Glanville, Albert Müller (eds.): Pask Present. Cat. of exhib. Atelier Färbergasse, Vienna, 2008, pp. 130–191.
 Scott, B. and Glanville G. (eds.) (2001). Special double issue of Kybernetes, Gordon Pask, Remembered and Celebrated, Part I, 30, 5/6.
 Scott, B. and Glanville G. (eds.) (2001). Special double issue of Kybernetes, Gordon Pask, Remembered and Celebrated, Part II, 30, 7/8.
 Scott, B. (ed. and commentary) (2011). "Gordon Pask: The Cybernetics of Self-Organisation, Learning and Evolution Papers 1960–1972" pp 648 Edition Echoraum (2011).

External links 

Pask: Biography  at International Federation for Systems Research
Biography at George Washington University
PDFs of Pask's books and key papers at pangaro.com
Gordon Pask in the MacTutor History of Mathematics archive
Pask archive
Conversation theory
Cybernetics Society biography: The foundations of Conversation Theory: Interactions of Actors Theory (IA)
QuickTime videos of Dr. Paul Pangaro teaching Cybernetics and Pask's Entailment Meshes at Stanford
QuickTime clip of Pask on Entailment Meshes
Pangaro's obituary in London Guardian
Rocha's obituary for International Journal of General Systems
Nick Green. (2004). "Axioms from Interactions of Actors Theory" Kybernetes, vol.33, no. 9/10, pp. 1433–1455.
 Thomas Dreher: History of Computer Art, chap. II.3.1.1 Gordon Pask's "Musicolour System", chap. II.3.2.3 Gordon Pask's "Colloquy of Mobiles".
Assertions and aphorisms of Gordon Pask at The Cybernetics Society

1928 births
1996 deaths
Academics of Brunel University London
Alumni of the Open University
People educated at Rydal Penrhos
Alumni of Liverpool John Moores University
Alumni of the University of London
Cyberneticists
English psychologists
Educational psychologists
Systems psychologists
Alumni of Downing College, Cambridge
Articles containing proofs
People from Derby
20th-century psychologists
Presidents of the International Society for the Systems Sciences